St Mary's Church, Brook is a parish church in the Church of England located in Brook, Isle of Wight.

History

The church dates from 1864 by the architect Malling. It replaced a previous building which was destroyed in a fire.  The small, squat tower contains a set of 8 tubular bells.

The churchyard contains six Commonwealth war graves, two British Army soldiers of World War I and, from World War II, three unidentified Merchant Navy seamen whose bodies had been washed ashore. and Royal Air Force Squadron Leader Nigel Seely (1902–1943), son of the politician and industrialist Sir Charles Seely, 2nd Baronet

A memorial to those killed in a 1957 flying boat crash also stands in the churchyard.

Parish status

The church is grouped with:
St Mary's Church, Brighstone
St Mary's Church, Brook
St Peter and St Paul's Church, Mottistone

Organ

The church has a two manual organ dating from 1867 by Bevington. A specification of the organ can be found on the National Pipe Organ Register.

References

External links
Interior and exterior photographs of St Mary's

Church of England church buildings on the Isle of Wight
Grade II listed buildings on the Isle of Wight
Mary